Yu Yeong-yeol (born 17 June 1961) is a South Korean wrestler. He competed in the men's Greco-Roman 100 kg at the 1988 Summer Olympics.

References

1961 births
Living people
South Korean male sport wrestlers
Olympic wrestlers of South Korea
Wrestlers at the 1988 Summer Olympics
Place of birth missing (living people)